Dance with The Shadows is a 1964 rock album by British instrumental (and sometimes vocal) group The Shadows. It was their third album. It reached number 2 in the album charts. The album was also released as a double-album with The Sound of The Shadows by MFP in the 1980s.

Track listing

Personnel
 Hank Marvin – Lead Guitar, piano and vocals
 Bruce Welch – Rhythm guitar and vocals
 John Rostill – Bass guitar
 Brian Locking – Bass guitar on "Blue Shadows", "Dakota" and "French Dressing"
 Brian Bennett – Drums and percussion
 Norrie Paramor – Producer
 Malcolm Addey – Engineer

Charts

References 

1964 albums
EMI Columbia Records albums
The Shadows albums
Albums produced by Norrie Paramor